Heart to Heart is an album by Diane Schuur and B.B. King.

Track listing 

 No One Ever Tells You (Carroll Coates, Hub Atwood)  4:58
 I Can't Stop Loving You (Don Gibson) 4:30
 You Don't Know Me (Cindy Walker, Eddy Arnold) 3:56
 It Had To Be You (Gus Kahn, Isham Jones) 3:18
 I'm Putting All My Eggs In One Basket (Irving Berlin) 3:35
 Glory of Love (Billy Hill) 3:51
 Try A Little Tenderness (Harry M. Woods, Jimmy Campbell, Reginald Connelly) 4:30
 Spirit in the Dark (Aretha Franklin) 5:03
 Freedom (Lotti Golden, Tommy Faragher) 4:45
 At Last (Harry Warren, Mack Gordon) 5:15
 They Can't Take That Away From Me 2:51

Personnel
B.B. King – vocals, guitar
Diane Schuur – vocals, piano
Chuck Berghofer – bass guitar
Vinnie Colaiuta – drums
Randy Waldman – piano
Paul Viapiano – guitar

References

1994 albums
Diane Schuur albums
B.B. King albums